Verkhniye Isady is a rural locality (a village) in Beryozovsky District, Perm Krai, Russia. The population was 8 as of 2010.

Geography 
Verkhniye Isady is located 25 km northeast of  Beryozovka (the district's administrative centre) by road. Nizhniye Isady is the nearest rural locality.

References 

Rural localities in Beryozovsky District, Perm Krai